This article lists events that occurred during 2001 in Estonia.

Incumbents
President – Arnold Rüütel
Prime Minister – Mart Laar

Events
12 May – musicians Tanel Padar and Dave Benton won with the song "Everybody" the Eurovision Song Contest 2001.
8 December – new political party Res Publica was established.

Births

Deaths

See also
 2001 in Estonian football
 2001 in Estonian television

References

 
2000s in Estonia
Estonia
Estonia
Years of the 21st century in Estonia